Colisée may refer to:

Canada
 Colisée de Québec, also known as Colisée Pepsi, Quebec City
 Colisée Cardin, Sorel-Tracy
 Colisée Desjardins, Victoriaville
 Colisée Financière Sun Life, Rimouski
 Colisée Jean Béliveau, Longueuil
 Colisée de Laval, Laval
 Colisée de Trois-Rivières, Trois-Rivières
 Colisée Vidéotron, Trois-Rivières
 Centre Georges-Vézina, formerly Colisée de Chicoutimi, Saguenay

France
 Le Colisée, an indoor arena in Chalon-sur-Saône

United States
 Androscoggin Bank Colisée, Lewiston